The 2012 Judo Grand Slam Tokyo was held in Tokyo, Japan, from 30 November to 2 December 2012.

Medal summary

Men's events

Women's events

Source Results

Medal table

References

External links
 

2012 IJF World Tour
2012 Judo Grand Slam
Judo
Grand Slam, 2012
Judo
Judo
Judo